flyadeal is a Saudi low-cost airline based at King Abdulaziz International Airport in Jeddah. It is owned by Saudi flag carrier Saudia. The airline began operation on 23 September 2017 serving domestic destinations.

History
Saudia, the flag carrier of Saudi Arabia, announced the creation of flyadeal on 17 April 2016. The venture is part of Saudia Group's SV2020 Transformation Strategy, which aims to elevate the group's units into world-class status by 2020. flyadeal targeted domestic travellers, Hajj and Umrah pilgrims and the rising number of tourists, among other groups. The airline launched flights on 23 September 2017, linking Jeddah to Riyadh.
On 10 June 2022 Flyadeal began operating flies from Dammam to Cairo.

Destinations
As of December 2022, flyadeal is serving the following destinations:

Domestic:

Abha - Abha Regional Airport
Al Bahah - Al-Baha Domestic Airport
Bisha - Bisha Domestic Airport
Dammam - King Fahd International Airport
Hail - Ha'il Regional Airport
Hofuf - Al-Ahsa International Airport
Jeddah - King Abdulaziz International Airport Base
Jizan - King Abdullah Bin Abdulaziz Airport
Medina - Prince Mohammad bin Abdulaziz Airport
Najran - Najran Domestic Airport
Neom - Neom Airport
Qassim - Prince Nayef Bin Abdulaziz International Airport
Qurayyat - Gurayat Domestic Airport
Riyadh - King Khalid International Airport
Sakakah - Al Jouf Airport
Tabuk - Tabuk Regional Airport
Taif - Taif Regional Airport
Jouf - Al Jouf Airport

International:
Amman - Queen Alia International Airport
Cairo - Cairo International Airport
Dubai - Dubai International Airport
Khartoum - Khartoum International Airport
Kuwait City - Kuwait International Airport
Istanbul - Istanbul Airport

Fleet
, flyadeal operates the following aircraft:

On 7 July 2019, flyadeal revealed its intention to order 30 Airbus A320neo aircraft with a further 20 options. flyadeal had previously committed to the Boeing 737 MAX but chose not to firm up its equivalent order of 30 aircraft and 20 options due to the Boeing 737 MAX groundings. Boeing attributed the decision to "scheduling requirements".

In July 2021, it was stated that flyadeal will start taking delivery of A320neo later in the year, as part of an order for up to 50 aircraft. The low cost carrier's future plans call for a fleet of 100 aircraft.

Incidents
On February 10, 2021, a flyadeal Airbus A320 registered as "HZ-FAB" was reported damaged after a Houthi drone attack at Abha International Airport in Saudi Arabia. No one was reported injured and investigations are still ongoing. The aircraft was repaired, and returned to service.

References

External links
 Official website

Saudia
Airlines of Saudi Arabia
Saudi Arabian brands
Airlines established in 2016
Low-cost carriers
Saudi Arabian companies established in 2016
2016 establishments in Saudi Arabia